Narahari Sonar (also spelt Narhari Sonar, literally Narahari the Goldsmith, a name often used in English sources)  or Narharidas was a 13th-century Hindu poet-saint of the Varkari sect and goldsmith (sonar) from Maharashtra, India. His hagiography speaks about his transition from a staunch Shaiva (devotee of the god Shiva) to a Vithoba-worshipping Varkari after a miracle that makes him realize that Vithoba and Shiva are one and the same.

Life

Narahari Sonar's chief hagiographical account is found in the Bhaktavijaya by Mahipati (1715 - 1790). Narahari Sonar was a staunch Shaiva (sect which considers the god Shiva as the Supreme Being), who lived in Pandharpur, where the chief temple of Vithoba stands. Vithoba is a form of the god Vishnu and the patron god of the Varkari sect, part of the Vishnu-worshipping Vaishnava sect and a rival sect of the Shaivas. Narahari Sonar worshipped at the Mallikarjuna temple, the Shiva temple located in the southwest part of the town. He is described as "bigoted" and "fanatic". He worshipped only one god, Shiva. He never visited the famous shrine of Vithoba even once and even refused to look at the shikhara (pinnacle) of the temple.

A merchant (in some versions, a rich landlord) had vowed if Vithoba blessed him with a son, he will offer a waistband to the deity. After fulfilment of the vow, the merchant enquired about the best goldsmith in Pandharpur and was led to Narahari Sonar. Narahari agreed to make the waistband on the condition that he will not enter the temple and the merchant bring him the measurements of the stone image of Vithoba. He crafted an ornate waistband with the gold and jewels brought by the merchant and the provided measurements. The merchant offered the waistband to Vithoba, but it was too tight. The merchant returned after Narahari lengthened the waistband, but it was too loose then. The merchant implored Narahari to come to the temple and fit the waistband himself, however Narahari was adamant. He said that he observed the vow of looking only at one deity, Shiva. The merchant suggested that he would blindfold Narahari to maintain the vow. Narahari conceded.

The merchant brought Narahari to the sanctum of Vithoba's temple, while people on the streets mocked Narahari's blindhold and his beliefs. Narahari touched Vithoba's image and felt as though the image had five heads and ten arms. The image wore serpent ornaments around his neck and matted hair on its head. He wore tiger and elephant skin garments and his body was covered in ash. Narahari recognised the iconography of his patron deity Shiva and removed the blindfold to see him. However, he saw the traditional form of Vithoba: a two-armed, arms-akimbo god standing on a brick in silken garments and gold finery. In disbelief, he blindfolded himself again and touched the image. Again, he felt as though he was touching an image of Shiva, not Vithoba. He realised that Shiva and Vithoba (Vishnu) were one and the same. He removes the blindfold and embraces Vithoba's feet. He sings a panegyric in honour of Vithoba, equating him with Vishnu and Shiva alike. Narahari becomes a devotee of Vithoba and joins the Varkaris, preaching the oneness of God.

R. D. Ranade records that Narahari lived in Devagiri (currently known as Daulatabad), before moving to Pandharpur. A staunch Shaiva, he was influenced by the Varkari saint Dnyaneshwar (1275–1296) and others to become the devotee of Vithoba. He died in 1313 (Shaka 1235).

Teachings in 
Narahari Sonar composed Marathi devotional poetry called . He speaks the ephemeral and unreal world, which like a picture on the wall. Just as children build stone houses and then abandon them, people engage in world affairs and then die. In another , he speaks about the importance of a guru. He talks about an "unstruck sound" has mesmerized his mind. By this sound, he thinks of God and mediates upon Him. Narahari says by his own experience that this sound will fill one with true love of God and lead to Him. He calls himself a goldsmith who deals in the name of God. Narahari's body is the melting vessel for his soul of gold. "In the matrix of three gunas, he pours the juice of God". He hammers out anger and passion from the soul. With scissors of discernment, he cuts the gold leaf of the name of God. He weighs the name of God with a balance of spiritual enlightenment. Narahari Sonar, the devotee of God, mediates upon Him eternally.

In another abhanga, Narahari Sonar alludes to his profession. He calls God his customer. He says that he "uses his intellect as the scissors to steal the gold of bhakti (devotion) while cutting a deal with his customer - God".

Remembrance
Apart from being formally included in the list of Sants (saints) in the Bhaktavijaya, the abhangas of Eknath accord him sainthood and mention him with other saints. Eknath's abhanga praises Vithoba who melted gold with Narahari.

The Sonar community, to which Narahari belonged, worship him at a shrine they have built in Pandharpur.

The Marathi feature film Katibandh, written by Navnath Pawar, directed by Mukund Bhujbal, produced by Rahul Prakash Jadhav of Nashik and Sanjay Jadhav, and edited by Ramesh Auti, released in August 2019, captures his life.

Notes

References
 
Sant Narhari Sonar Website

Warkari
Medieval Hindu religious leaders
Hindu poets
Marathi people
13th-century Indian poets
Indian male poets